José Reynaldo Bencosme de Leon (16 May 1992) is an Italian of Dominican descent 400m hurdler semifinalist at the 2012 Summer Olympics.

Biography
Of Dominican and later acquired Italian citizenship, born in Concepción de La Vega, he arrived in Italy from the Dominican Republic with his mother, obtaining Italian citizenship in January 2009.

Personal bests
 200 metres: 21.31 ( Fossano, 9 May 2010)
 400 metres: 47.89 ( Mondovì, 2 June 2010)
 400 metres hurdles: 48.91 ( Oran, 1 July 2022)

Achievements
Youth level

Senior level

National titles
He won four national championships.
 Italian Athletics Championships
 400 metres hurdles: 2011, 2012, 2016, 2018

See also
 Italian all-time lists - 400 metres hurdles

References

External links
 

1992 births
Italian male hurdlers
Living people
Athletes (track and field) at the 2012 Summer Olympics
Olympic athletes of Italy
People from La Vega Province
Naturalised citizens of Italy
World Athletics Championships athletes for Italy
Athletics competitors of Fiamme Azzurre
Athletics competitors of Fiamme Gialle
Athletes (track and field) at the 2022 Mediterranean Games
Mediterranean Games competitors for Italy